A prison visitor is a person who visits prisons to befriend and monitor the welfare of prisoners in general, as distinct from a person who visits a specific prisoner to whom they have a prior connection. Prisons may also have a visiting committee.

Organizations
There are voluntary organisations of prison visitors in many jurisdictions, some of which have official recognition. Examples include:
 National Association of Official Prison Visitors in the United Kingdom
 Prisoners' Friends' Association in Hong Kong 
 Prisoner Visitation and Support in the United States
 Norwegian Red Cross in Norway

References

Further reading
 

Prisons